Vernon Kremer Irvine (June 24, 1871 – September 4, 1942) was an American college football coach and educator. He served as the head football coach at the University of North Carolina at Chapel Hill for one season, in 1894, compiling a record of 6–3.

Irvine was born one June 24, 1871 in Bedford, Pennsylvania. He attended Phillips Exeter Academy, where played football as an end, and Princeton University, where he was captain of the "scrub" football team. Irvine was the principal of Butler High School in Butler, Pennsylvania for 36 years, until his retirement in 1934 due to poor health. He moved to St. Petersburg, Florida, where he died September 4, 1942.

Head coaching record

References

1871 births
1942 deaths
American school principals
North Carolina Tar Heels football coaches
Phillips Exeter Academy alumni
Princeton University alumni
People from Bedford, Pennsylvania
People from Butler, Pennsylvania
Coaches of American football from Pennsylvania
Educators from Pennsylvania